Acrobasis caryae, the hickory shoot borer, is a species of snout moth in the genus Acrobasis. It was described by Augustus Radcliffe Grote in 1881, and is known from southeastern Ontario, Canada, and the eastern United States.

The larvae feed on Carya species, including Carya cordiformis, Carya tomentosa, Carya pallida, Carya glabra, Carya ovata and Carya carolinae-septentrionalis. They feed within the shoots of their host plant.

References

Moths described in 1881
Acrobasis
Moths of North America